Out of Control is a demo album by English punk rock band, the Anti-Nowhere League. The album is made up of rough demos recorded by the band in 1980 prior to the release of their debut album We Are...The League.

Track listing
(all songs written by Kulmer/Exall).

"Loser" – 1:49
"Landlord Is a Wanker" – 3:10
"I Get Bored" – 3:02
"Head in the Wall" – 3:29
"Street Life" – 2:43
"Fat Bastards" – 3:04
"Dirty Old Fucker" – 2:53
"This Is the 80s" – 2:40
"Out of Control" – 2:38
"Gimmie Money" – 2:41
"I Don't Wanna" – 2:43
"Useless Bastards" – 2:54
"Military Man" – 2:48
"Sex & Fantasy" – 3:24
"Top of the Pops" – 3:13

Anti-Nowhere League albums
2000 albums